A Berman hearing is a provision under California law for the administrative resolution of wage claims before the California Labor Commissioner.  The hearing is named after Howard Berman, the member of the California State Assembly who instituted it.

References

United States labor law
California law